The Red Guard of Senegal (French: Garde Rouge du Sénégal) is a unit of the Senegalese Gendarmerie that is responsible for presidential security. It also has ceremonial duties and assists in general policing. It is very similar in concept to the French Republican Guard, with which it is officially twinned. The Red Guard is the direct descendant of a French colonial Spahi detachment sent to Senegal in 1845.

This spahi unit is also known as the Red Guard of the Presidency (Garde Rouge de la Présidence) or Red Guard of Dakar.

The name "Red Guard" is derived from their red tunics and burnous cloaks.

Background and heritage
French Spahis were required to range over vast areas of the Sahara desert and in 1845 a squadron was sent to Saint-Louis du Sénégal in response to tribal conflicts on the banks of the Senegal river. This detachment became a Senegalese-recruited branch of the Spahis. The Senegalese Spahis saw extensive active service in French West Africa and in Morocco over a period of 80 years. These cavalry squadrons were disbanded in 1928 as a cost-saving measure but provided the basis for a newly raised mounted gendarmerie.

In the twentieth century the Senegalese spahis were known as the "Colonial Guard" (Garde coloniale) of the "Colonial Gendarmerie". In 1960, on independence, the Colonial Guard was renamed "Presidential Guard" (Garde présidentielle), while the Colonial Gendarmerie as a whole became the National Gendarmerie.

The Red Guard places great emphasis on its heritage from the French empire, and considers itself "guardian of the traditions of the squadrons which distinguished themselves on countless battlefields in black Africa and Morocco, in the service of France" ("la gardienne des traditions des escadrons qui s’illustrèrent sur d’innombrables champs de batailles, tant en Afrique Noire qu’au Maroc au nom de la France")

Organisation
The Red Guard is part of the Security Legion of the Mobile Gendarmerie. It is divided into three "groups of squadrons", each consisting of two squadrons.

Presidential Guard Group of Squadrons

One squadron of this group works within the presidential palace, and the other in the vicinity of the palace.

Protection Group of Squadrons
This group is responsible for the close personal protection of the president.

Escorts and Services Group of Squadrons
This group consists of the Mounted Squadron and the Motorcycle Squadron.

Mounted Squadron

This is the premier ceremonial unit of the Red Guard. It is used for visits by foreign heads of state. The guard consists of 120 cavalrymen, including a mounted band of 35 musicians. Parades are led by the band, on white horses with their tails dyed red. There are three platoons in the squadron; the 1st and 3rd platoons are mounted on bay horses, the 2nd on white horses.

The squadron also fulfils mounted police duties for the maintenance of public order, notably on beaches.

Motorcycle Squadron
This squadron provides a road escort for presidential convoys and for similar convoys (e.g. for the Senegalese prime minister and visiting dignitaries from abroad). The squadron can also provide ordinary traffic police services.

References

External links

The Red Guard - Official Presidential Website
 Senegalese Protocol Horse Squadron Rehearsing for Xi’s Visit

Military of Senegal
Law enforcement in Senegal
Law of Senegal
Guards of honour